Girolamo Basso della Rovere (1434–1507) was an Italian Cardinal of the  Roman Catholic Church.

Life
Basso della Rovere was born in Albissola Marina, the son of Giovanni Basso (Marquess of Bistagno and Monastero) and his wife Luchina della Rovere of the House of della Rovere and sister of Pope Sixtus IV

He was Bishop of Albenga in 1472, and then Bishop of Recanati in 1476. He was created cardinal on 10 December 1477 by his uncle, Pope Sixtus IV.

Between 1471 and 1484 he built a new family chapel in the Basilica of Santa Maria del Popolo in Rome, the same church that his relatives, Pope Sixtus IV and Domenico della Rovere, significantly rebuilt and embellished. The Basso Della Rovere Chapel was decorated by the favourite artist of the family, Pinturicchio, and his workshop. Girolamo's father, Giovanni Basso, was buried in the chapel.

References

Further reading
Ian Verstegen, Patronage and Dynasty: The Rise of the Della Rovere in Renaissance Italy (Truman State University Press, 2007)

1434 births
1507 deaths
People from the Province of Savona
15th-century Italian cardinals
Cardinal-bishops of Sabina
15th-century Italian Roman Catholic bishops
16th-century Italian Roman Catholic bishops
Cardinal-nephews
Girolamo
16th-century Italian cardinals